Mustafa bey Nadir Agha oglu Vakilov (1896 – 1965) was an Azerbaijani public figure, politician and diplomat. He served as the Minister of Internal Affairs. Vakilov was the youngest Azerbaijani minister.

Early life
Vakilov was born in 1899 in Salahlı village located in the Qazakh district of the Elisavetpol Governorate. He graduated from the Baku gymnasium and entered the Law Department of the Moscow State University in 1912. That's where he got involved in Azerbaijani national movement. His uncle Mammad Rza Vakilov and close relative Alimardan Topchubashev played significant role in his ideological development. He later worked as a consultant to the Commissar for Internal Affairs of Transcaucasian Commissariat Akaki Chkhenkeli. He was also one of the most active members of the Muslim faction of Transcaucasian Sejm.

Political career
Vakilov was affiliated with Musavat Party and served as its second chairman. He was a deputy to National Assembly of Azerbaijan. He was a member of Financial Budgetary Appropriations Commission within the parliament along with Mammad Emin Rasulzade and Nariman Narimanbeyov. Vakilov then served in the 5th cabinet of Azerbaijan Democratic Republic under Nasib Yusifbeyli as Deputy Minister of Internal Affairs. On February 15, 1920 he was appointed the Minister of Internal Affairs. He was the youngest minister within ADR government. With establishment of Soviet authority in Azerbaijan on April 28, 1920 Vakilov fled to Turkey.

He died in Amasya, Turkey in 1965.

See also
Azerbaijani National Council

External links

References

1896 births
1965 deaths
Azerbaijani Muslims
People from Elizavetpol Governorate
Azerbaijan Democratic Republic politicians
Government ministers of Azerbaijan
Azerbaijani publicists
People from Qazax District
Moscow State University alumni
Azerbaijani anti-communists
Azerbaijani emigrants to Turkey